Saim Ayub (born 24 May 2002) is a Pakistani cricketer who plays as an opening batsman.

Domestic career
In February 2021, Saim made his Twenty20 debut for Quetta Gladiators in the 2021 Pakistan Super League. 

In March 2022, he made his List A debut for Sindh in the 2021–22 Pakistan Cup.

In September 2022, he made his first-class debut for Sindh in the Quaid-e-Azam Trophy 2022/23.

Pakistan Super League 
In February 2023, while playing for Peshawar Zalmi during the 2023 PSL, he hit his maiden PSL half-century off 33 deliveries, observers comparing him to Saeed Anwar. Saim Ayub continues to make his mark in the PSL 2023 season with consistent run scoring for Peshawar Zalmi along with Babar Azam. In match 25 between Peshawar Zalmi and Quetta Gladiators in the PSL 2023 season, Saim scored 74 off 34 and helped Peshawar Zalmi post 240/2 in 20 overs. In match 27 of PSL 2023, Saim Ayub played a blistering knock of 58 off 33 balls.

International career
In December 2022, alongside fast bowler Ihsanullah and batsman Haseebullah Khan, ​Saim Ayub was one of the three youngsters selected to be included in the national squad for the second Test match of the New Zealand series in Karachi, so they could get some international exposure and see the dynamics of the dressing room.

In March 2023, he was named in Pakistan's Twenty20 International (T20I) squad for the series against Afghanistan.

References

External links
 

2002 births
Living people
Pakistani cricketers
Quetta Gladiators cricketers
Sindh cricketers
Cricketers from Karachi